Ellen Meiksins Wood  (April 12, 1942  January 14, 2016) was an American-Canadian Marxist political theorist and historian.

Biography
Wood was born in New York City on April 12, 1942, as Ellen Meiksins one year after her parents, Latvian Jews active in the Bund, arrived in New York from Europe as political refugees. She was raised in the United States and Europe.

Wood received a Bachelor of Arts degree in Slavic languages from the University of California, Berkeley, in 1962 and subsequently entered the graduate program in political science at the University of California, Los Angeles, from which she received her Doctor of Philosophy degree in 1970. From 1967 to 1996, she taught political science at Glendon College, York University, in Toronto, Ontario, Canada.

With Robert Brenner, Ellen Meiksins Wood articulated the foundations of political Marxism, a strand of Marxist theory that places history at the centre of its analysis.  It provoked a turn away from structuralisms and teleology towards historical specificity as contested process and lived praxis.

Meiksins Wood's many books and articles were sometimes written in collaboration with her husband, Neal Wood (1922–2003). Her work has been translated into many languages, including Spanish, Portuguese, Italian, French, German, Romanian, Turkish, Chinese, Korean, and Japanese. Of these, The Retreat from Class received the Deutscher Memorial Prize in 1988. Wood served on the editorial committee of the British journal New Left Review between 1984 and 1993.  From 1997 to 2000, Wood was an editor, along with Harry Magdoff and Paul Sweezy, of Monthly Review, the socialist magazine.

In 1996, she was inducted into the Royal Society of Canada, a marker of distinguished scholarship. She and Neal Wood divided their time between England and Canada until he died in 2003.

In 2014, she married Ed Broadbent, former leader of the New Democratic Party of Canada, with whom she lived in Ottawa and London for six years until her death from cancer at the age of 73.

Books

Sole author
  Mind and Politics: An Approach to the Meaning of Liberal and Socialist Individualism. University of California Press, 1972.
 The Retreat from Class: A New 'True' Socialism. Schocken Books, 1986. . Verso Classics, January 1999. Reprint with new introduction. .
 The Pristine Culture of Capitalism. Verso, 1992. .
Democracy Against Capitalism: Renewing Historical Materialism. Cambridge University Press, 1995. . Excerpt available here
 Peasant-Citizen and Slave: The Foundations of Athenian Democracy. Verso, February 20, 1997. .
 The Origin of Capitalism. Monthly Review Press, 1999, 120 pp. , . Revised edition: The Origin of Capitalism: A Longer View. Verso Books, 2002, 213 pp. , .
 Empire of Capital, Verso, 2003. ;  paperback : Verso, 2005.  .
Citizens to Lords: A Social History of Western Political Thought from Antiquity to the Middle Ages. Verso, 2008. .
 Liberty & Property: A Social History of Western Political Thought from Renaissance to Enlightenment. Verso, 2012. .

Co-authored with Neal Wood
 Class Ideology and Ancient Political Theory: Socrates, Plato, and Aristotle in Social Context. Oxford University Press, 1978. 
 A Trumpet of Sedition: Political Theory and the Rise of Capitalism, 1509-1688. New York University Press, 1997 and London: Pluto Press, 1997.

Co-edited collections
 In Defense of History: Marxism and the Postmodern Agenda, ed. with John Bellamy Foster. Monthly Review Press, 1997. 
 Capitalism and the Information Age: The Political Economy of the Global Communication Revolution, ed. with Robert W. McChesney and John Bellamy Foster. Monthly Review Press, 1998. 
 Rising from the Ashes? Labor in the Age of "Global" Capitalism, ed. with Peter Meiksins and Michael Yates. Monthly Review Press, 1998.

Publications available online
 "C.B. MacPherson: Liberalism, And The Task Of Socialist Political Theory", The Socialist Register, Vol.15 (1978), pp. 215–240. Critical evaluation of the thought of C. B. Macpherson. [Retrieved April 18, 2010]
 "Liberal Democracy And Capitalist Hegemony: A Reply To Leo Panitch On The Task Of Socialist Political Theory", The Socialist Register, Vol. 18 (1981), pp. 169–189. On socialist political theory. [Retrieved April 18, 2010]
 "Marxism Without Class Struggle?", The Socialist Register, Vol. 20 (1983), pp. 239–271. [Retrieved April 18, 2010]
 "The Uses and Abuses of 'Civil' Society,", The Socialist Register, Vol. 26: The Retreat of the Intellectuals (1990), pp. 60–84. [Retrieved April 18, 2010]
 "Ralph Milband, 1924-1994", Radical Philoshopy, issue 68 (Autumn 1994). Homage to Ralph Miliband
"A Chronology of the New Left and its Successors, or: Who's Old-Fashioned Now?", The Socialist Register, Vol. 31: Why Not Capitalism? (1995), pp. 22–49.
"Modernity, Postmodernity, or Capitalism?", Monthly Review (July–August 1996). [Retrieved from http://findarticles.com/ April 18, 2010]
 "Issues of class and culture: an interview with Aijaz Ahmad", Monthly Review (October 1996). [Retrieved from http://findarticles.com/ April 18, 2010]
 "Back to Marx,", Monthly Review, Vol. 49, No. 2 (June 1997).
 "Labor, the State, and Class Struggle,", Monthly Review, Vol. 49, No. 3 (July–August 1997).
 "A Note on Du Boff and Herman", Monthly Review, Vol. 49, No. 6 (November 1997). A note on globalization.
"Class compacts, the welfare state, and epochal shifts: a reply to Frances Fox Piven and Richard A. Cloward - New Press, p.13, 1997" (January 1998).
 "The Communist Manifesto After 150 Years,", Monthly Review, Vol.  50, No. 1 (May 1998).
 "The Agrarian Origins of Capitalism,", Monthly Review, Vol. 50, No. 3 (July–August 1998).
 "Capitalist Change and Generational Shifts,", Monthly Review, Vol. 50, No. 5 (October 1998).
 "Kosovo and the New Imperialism", Monthly Review, Vol. 51, No. 2 (June 1999).
 "Unhappy Families: Global Capitalism in a World of Nation-States", Monthly Review, Vol. 51, No. 3 (July–August 1999).
 "The Politics of Capitalism", Monthly Review, Vol. 51, No. 4 (September 1999).
 "Eurocentric Anti-Eurocentrism", solidarity-us.org (2001). A Critique of Eurocentric Anti-Eurocentrism

See also
 Brenner debate

References

External links
Interviews
 "Interview with Ellen Meiksins Wood - Democracy & Capitalism: Friends or Foes?", New Socialist Magazine, Vol. 1, Issue 1, (January–February 1996).
"An interview with Ellen Meiksins Wood", by Christopher Phelps. Monthly Review,  Vol. 51, No. 1 (May 1999).
 Downloadable radio interview on the origins of capitalism.

Book reviews
 "Happy Campers" book review of Why Not Socialism? by G.A. Cohen, London Review of Books, Vol. 32, No. 2 (January 28, 2010) [Retrieved April 18, 2010]
 "Why It Matters" book review of Hobbes and Republican Liberty, by Quentin Skinner. London Review of Books, Vol. 30, No. 18 (September 25, 2008) [Retrieved April 18, 2010]

Obituaries
Marxism loses a passionate champion by Alex Callinicos, Socialist Review, 410 (February 2016). 
Remembering Ellen Meiksins Wood by Vivek Chibber, Jacobin (January 2016).
 Frances Abele, George Comninel and Peter Meiksins, 'Socialism and democracy: the political engagements of Ellen Meiksins Wood', Studies in Political Economy: A Socialist Review, 97 (2016), 320-36, https://dx.doi.org/10.1080/07078552.2016.1249124

1942 births
2016 deaths
20th-century American historians
21st-century American historians
American Marxist historians
American people of Latvian-Jewish descent
American women political scientists
American political scientists
American political philosophers
American women historians
Canadian Marxists
Women Marxists
Critics of postmodernism
Deaths from cancer in Ontario
Fellows of the Royal Society of Canada
Jewish American historians
Jewish socialists
Marxist theorists
Deutscher Memorial Prize winners
UC Berkeley College of Letters and Science alumni
University of California, Los Angeles alumni
Academic staff of York University
20th-century American women writers
21st-century American women
Academic staff of Glendon College